Horst Böhme may refer to:

 Horst Böhme (SS officer) (1909–1945), leading perpetrator of the Holocaust.
 Horst Böhme (chemist) (1908–1996), German chemist
 Horst Wolfgang Böhme (born 1940), German archaeologist

See also
Böhme (surname)